The Kodava Sahitya Academy is an organisation under the Government of Karnataka which preserves and promotes the Kodava language, literature and culture.

Foundation
The Karnataka Kodava Sahitya Academy was founded in 1994 when Veerappa Moily was the Chief Minister of Karnataka.

Recent developments
Every year, the Kodava Sahitya Academy announces and confers awards upon Kodava speaking achievers in the fields of culture and language. The academy also publishes books in the Kodava language.

Since 2021, the Mangalore University now teaches an MA degree in the Kodava language.

See also 
 Kodagu
 Kodava language
 Kodava people
 Karnataka ethnic groups

References 

Indic literature societies
Dravidian languages
Languages of India